The Wagalla massacre was a massacre of ethnic Somalis by the Kenyan Army on 10 February 1984 in Wajir County, Kenya.
Daniel arap Moi opened barracks near Wagalla, where he brought soldiers to 'discipline the villagers irrespective of age'.

Massacre

Overview 

The massacre took place on 10 February 1984 at the Wagalla Airstrip against the Degoodi clan. It was facilitated by other Somali clans who spied and helped Kenyan troops. The facility is situated approximately 15 km (9 mi) west of the county capital of Wajir in the former North Eastern Province, a region primarily inhabited by the Somalis. Kenyan troops had descended on the area to reportedly help defuse clan-related conflict.

However, according to eye-witness testimony, about 5,000 Somali men of were then taken to an airstrip and prevented from accessing water and food for five days before being executed by Kenyan soldiers.
In 1984 former dictator president Siad Barre's of Somalia response to the Kenyan president: The Somali people [in Kenya] who are being mercilessly persecuted, it is something I cannot watch idly. The persecution inflicted upon them clearly reveals that Kenya does not regard them as part of the Kenyan society, if they did, they would not have treated them this inhumanely. The obligation of Somalism [i.e. shared ethnicity] forces us not to watch idly if we are the Somali government and we will take a clear action
I say this to the Kenyan government; I have instructed Somalia's military to be put on high alert and be ready for any subsequent orders. If the Kenyan government does not stop this campaign of ethnic cleansing against the Somali people in Kenya, be assured that their silent cry will not fall on deaf ears [i.e. military action).

According to a commissioner with The Truth, Justice and Reconciliation Commission of Kenya, a government oversight body that had been formed in response to the 2008 Kenyan post-election violence, the Wagalla massacre represents the worst human rights violation in Kenya's history.

Death toll
The exact number of people killed in the massacre is unknown. However, eyewitnesses place the figure at around 5,000 deaths.

Aftermath
For years the Kenyan government denied that a massacre had taken place and insisted that "only 57 people were killed in a security operation to disarm the [area's] residents". It was not until October 2000 that the government publicly acknowledged wrongdoing on the part of its security forces.

In 2010, Bethuel Kiplagat stepped aside as chairman of the Truth, Justice, and Reconciliation Commission because of his alleged involvement in authorising the action that led to the massacre. Reports of the number of men from the Somali Degodia sub-clan, in particular, that were detained by security forces and brought to the airstrip range from 381
to upward of ten thousand.

In April 2012, Kiplagat was reinstated as TJRC chairman after the Justice Minister Eugene Wamalwa brokered a truce between him and the other commissioners.

The same year, the former Kenyan Prime Minister Raila Odinga ordered an official probe into the atrocities and indicated that the national attorney general should bring to justice those responsible for the killings. Odinga also ordered a museum to be constructed in honour of the victims.

In memory and honor of those who lost their lives in this massacre, Kenya National Commission on Human Rights (KNCHR) in conjunction with local and international partners has supported the construction of a monument in Wajir Town. The Monument, which is set to be unveiled on 14 February 2014, has the names of 482 victims engraved on marble and pasted on a wall. These names were taken from the Truth Justice and Reconciliation Commission report and subjected to a thorough validation exercise for purposes of ensuring that they were indeed names of the people who lost their lives as a result of the massacre.

In February 2015, the Wajir County governor Ahmed Abdullahi said his government would partner with local and international human rights organisations in seeking justice for the victims of the massacre, saying that the Truth Commission report offered such an opportunity which remained squandered. "Those mentioned by the TJRC report and witnesses must be prosecuted. The people who afflicted the pain to our people remain unpunished and are still with us," Abdullahi said.

Film
The film/documentary Scarred: The Anatomy of a Massacre, directed by Judy Kibinge, founder of the East African Documentary Film Fund, is the first independent visual attempt to chronicle the history of the massacre as experienced by both the victims and survivors, some of whom were government officials. The documentary was launched at the National Museum in Nairobi in February 2015.

See also
 Garissa massacre
 History of Kenya
 List of massacres in Kenya
 Human rights in Kenya
 Shifta War

References

Further reading
Salah Abdi Sheik, Blood on the Runway: The Wagalla Massacre of 1984, (Northern Pub. House: 2007)

1984 in Kenya
Massacres in 1984
Massacres in Kenya
Conflicts in 1984
Wajir County
Massacres of men
February 1984 events in Africa
Violence against men in Africa
Anti-Somali sentiment